Marcelo Battistuzzi (born July 20, 1976 in São Paulo) is a Brazilian racing driver. He has raced in such series as International Formula 3000 and Italian Formula 3000. He won both the German Formula Opel and European Formula Opel championships in 1997.

Started his career racing Karts in Brazil in 1989.  After good results and wins in Campinas and São Paulo Championships, moved to single-seaters, entering the Brazilian Formula Ford Championship with his own team (1993).  Moved to UK to start his international career: British Formula Ford Championship (1994, Team Dynamic Team Suspensions), Formula Vauxhall (1995 DMMS - 1996, Bellringer Motorsport), German and European Formula Opel (1997, Vergani Racing team), International Formula 3000 (1998 Apomatox teams and Prost Junior team / 1999 - Jr team Arrows teams, Redgrave, Coloni, Monaco and Petrobras Junior) and Italian Formula 3000 (2000, Monaco Racing).

His main results was achieved in 1997, when he clinched the European and German Formula Opel Championship, organized by EFDA, highlighted as the Brazilian driver competing abroad with the most wins that season (9 wins)

After leaving the tracks, Marcelo dedicated his time running his own company, Virtual Grand Prix, the first Brazilian company to develop racing simulators for events.

Complete International Formula 3000 results

(key) (Races in bold indicate pole position) (Races in italics indicate fastest lap)

Complete Italian/Euro Formula 3000 results

(key) (Races in bold indicate pole position; races in italics indicate fastest lap)

References

External links
 Official website
 
 Speedsports Magazine

1976 births
Living people
Brazilian people of Italian descent
Brazilian racing drivers
Racing drivers from São Paulo

Scuderia Coloni drivers
International Formula 3000 drivers